Jonathan William Coppess was the administrator of the Farm Service Agency (FSA) of the Department of Agriculture, and was appointed on July 9, 2009 by Agriculture Secretary Tom Vilsack.

Early life and education

Coppess grew up on his family's corn and soybean farm, located in Darke County, Ohio, near Union City. He maintains an interest in the seven-generation family farm that his father and brother continue to operate. He earned a J.D. with honors from the George Washington University Law School in Washington, D.C., and received a bachelor's degree in business from Miami University in Oxford, Ohio. He has been admitted to the bar in both the State of Illinois and the District of Columbia.

Career

Early career

Before moving to Washington to pursue a career in agricultural policy, Coppess practiced law in Chicago for several years as a commercial litigator for Freeborn & Peters, LLP. Prior to attending law school, he worked at Archer Daniels Midland as a Grain Merchandiser. Coppess was responsible for commodity purchasing, processed-product sales, and related hedging activities utilizing the Chicago Board of Trade.

Legislative career

Prior to joining FSA, Coppess worked for United States Senator Ben Nelson as his legislative assistant for agriculture, energy and environment. In this capacity, he advised Senator Nelson, a member of the Senate Committee on Agriculture, Nutrition, and Forestry, on agricultural issues and worked extensively on the 2008 Farm Bill legislation. Coppess also helped formulate policy on biofuels, rural development, energy, environmental and trade issues.

Farm Service Agency

Agriculture Secretary Tom Vilsack named Jonathan Coppess administrator of the Farm Service Agency on July 9, only three days after Doug Caruso, who had been appointed in April, abruptly quit. "Jonathan Coppess brings a wealth of agricultural policy experience to USDA's leadership team," Vilsack said. "His farm background will be invaluable as President Obama and I work to assure the soundness of the safety net for American farmers and ranchers."

In November 2020, Coppess was named a member of the Joe Biden presidential transition Agency Review Team to support transition efforts related to the United States Department of Agriculture.

Personal life

Coppess is a registered member of the Democratic Party. Coppess resides in Washington, D.C., with his wife Susan and daughter Abigail.

References

External links

Official FSA Website

Miami University alumni
Living people
Farmers from Ohio
George Washington University Law School alumni
Obama administration personnel
Year of birth missing (living people)